Han Tha Myint (also spelt Han Thar Myint) is a Burmese politician. He currently serves on the National League for Democracy's Central Executive Committee and is a party spokesman. 

Han Tha Myint won the seat in the Pyithu Hluttaw to represent the Budalin Township Constituency No. 1 during the 1990 Burmese general election, winning about 81% of the votes (16,645 valid votes). The Union Election Commission announced his forced resignation from the post on 11 June 1996. In the wake of the 2021 Myanmar coup d'état on 1 February, Han Tha Myint was detained by the Myanmar Armed Forces.

He was born to parents Thein Pe Myint and Khin Khin Kyi on 7 May 1948 in Rangoon, Burma. His father Thein Pe Myint was a prominent Anti-Fascist People's Freedom League leader and a close friend of General Aung San. Han Tha Myint obtained a Bachelor of Engineering degree from the Rangoon Institute of Technology in 1970.

References

People from Yangon
Burmese politicians
1948 births
Living people